The following highways are numbered 895:

Canada
 Alberta Highway 895
 New Brunswick Route 895

United States
  Interstate 895
  Maryland Route 895 (former)
  Nevada State Route 895
  New York State Route 895
  Pennsylvania Route 895
  Virginia State Route 895